James M. Groves was an American politician. As a Unionist, he was elected member of the Nevada Assembly on November 6, 1866, where he and W. T. Jones represented Nye County. Groves' term started the next day and he served in one regular and one special session. His term ended in November 1868. Groves and Jones were succeeded by William Doolin and John Bowman.

References 

Nevada Unionists
Members of the Nevada Assembly
People from Nye County, Nevada
19th-century American politicians